This is a list of notable events in music that took place in the year 1983.

Specific locations
1983 in British music
1983 in Norwegian music

Specific genres
1983 in new wave music
1983 in heavy metal music
1983 in hip hop music
1983 in jazz

Trends
CDs become popular among classical music listeners.

Events

January–April
January 1
ZTT Records is founded.
The Merchant Ivory film Heat and Dust is released. On the soundtrack, composed by Zakir Hussain, Ivory is featured on tanpura with Hussain (who also appeared in the film) on tabla.
January 8 – The UK singles chart is tabulated from this week forward by The Gallup Organization. In 1984 electronic terminals will be used in selected stores to gather sales information, and the old "sales diary" method will be gradually phased out over the next few years.
February 2 – "Menudomania" comes to New York as 3,500 screaming girls crowd Kennedy Airport to catch a glimpse of Puerto Rican boy band Menudo, who are playing six sold-out shows at the Felt Forum.
February 4 – Karen Carpenter died at age 32 from heart failure due to complications from anorexia nervosa.
February 11 – The Rolling Stones concert film Let's Spend the Night Together opens in New York.
February 13 – Marvin Gaye performs "The Star-Spangled Banner" before the NBA All-Star Game.
February 23 – The 25th Annual Grammy Awards are presented in Los Angeles, hosted by John Denver. Toto win both Album of the Year (for Toto IV) and Record of the Year (for "Rosanna"), while Willie Nelson's cover of "Always on My Mind" wins Song of the Year. Men at Work win Best New Artist.
February 26 – Michael Jackson's Thriller album hits #1 on the US charts, the first of thirty-seven (non-consecutive) weeks it would spend there on its way to becoming the biggest-selling album of all time.
February 28 – U2 release their 3rd album War which debuts at #1 in the UK and produces the band's first international hit single.
March 2 – Compact discs go on sale in the United States. They had first been released in Japan the previous October.
March 4 – Neil Young cancels the remainder of his tour after collapsing backstage in Louisville, Kentucky, after playing for seventy-five minutes.
March 5 – Thompson Twins have their first chart success as "Love on Your Side" enters the Top 10 in the UK.
March 26 
Duran Duran enters the UK Singles Chart at number 1 with their first UK number 1 single "Is There Something I Should Know?".
Tears for Fears debut album The Hurting reach number 1 on the UK Albums Chart. 
April 5
A Generative Theory of Tonal Music by Fred Lerdahl and Ray Jackendoff is published.
US Interior Secretary James G. Watt causes controversy when he effectively bans the Beach Boys from a return performance at the Fourth of July festivities in Washington, announcing that Wayne Newton would perform instead. Watt claims that rock bands attract "the wrong element". That same week President Reagan, himself an avowed Beach Boys fan, presents Watt with a plaster foot with a hole in it.
April 9 – David Bowie achieves his fourth UK number 1 single with "Let's Dance". 
April 11 – Dave Mustaine is fired from Metallica just as the band is set to begin recording its début album. He is replaced by Kirk Hammett.
April 14 – David Bowie releases Let's Dance, his first album since parting ways with RCA Records and his fifteenth studio album overall. With its deliberate shift to mainstream dance-rock, it would become Bowie's biggest commercial success, at 10.7 million copies sold worldwide. Bowie, however, would experience a critical downturn for the next ten years as a result of his perceived obligation to continue appealing to fans of the album.
April 18 – Ellen Taaffe Zwilich becomes the first woman to win the Pulitzer Prize for Music.
April 23 – French singer Corinne Hermès, representing Luxembourg, wins the 28th annual Eurovision Song Contest, held at Rudi-Sedlmayer-Halle in Munich, with the song "Si la vie est cadeau".

May–August
May 16
Singer Anna Vissi marries composer Nikos Karvelas.
The Motown 25 Special airs on NBC, celebrating a quarter century of Motown Records. Michael Jackson unveils his moonwalk dance move during a performance of "Billie Jean".
May 28–June 4 – The second US Festival is held at Glen Helen Park in California.
June 3 – American rock drummer Jim Gordon commits matricide during a schizophrenic episode.
June 18–19 – Menudo make their second visit to New York. The band plays four shows at Madison Square Garden and all 80,000 tickets sell out within three days of going on sale.
June 20 – Catalunya Ràdio begins broadcasting.
July 1 – Chilean Band Los Prisioneros debut at the Miguel Leon Prado High School Song festival. They pretended to personify the rebellion of young Chileans leading to protests against Augusto Pinochet.
July 6 – As a statement of protest against music piracy in the form of home taping, Jean-Michel Jarre releases only one pressing of his latest album "Music for Supermarkets", which is sold at an auction to a French real estate dealer for 69,000 francs (about US$8960). The auction is broadcast live on Radio Luxembourg which also plays the album in full for the first and only time.
July 19 – Simon and Garfunkel begin their North American summer tour in Akron, Ohio.
July 21 – Diana Ross performs a filmed concert in Central Park in heavy rain; eventually the storm forces her to postpone the rest of the concert until next day.
July 25 – Metallica release their debut studio album, Kill 'Em All, since hailed as a groundbreaking release for the burgeoning thrash metal genre.
July 29 – Friday Night Videos is broadcast for the first time on NBC.
August 5 – David Crosby is sentenced by a judge in Dallas, Texas to five years in prison on drug and weapon possession charges.
August 16
Johnny Ramone suffers a near-fatal head injury during a fight over a girl in front of his East Village apartment.
Singer Paul Simon marries actress Carrie Fisher.
August 20 – The Rolling Stones sign a new $28 million contract with CBS Records, the largest recording contract in history up to this time.

September–December
September – Bonnie Tyler releases the album Faster Than the Speed of Night in United States
September 1 – Joe Strummer and Paul Simonon of The Clash issue a press statement announcing Mick Jones has been fired from the group.
September 4 – Phil Lynott performs his final show with Thin Lizzy in Nuremberg, Germany.
September 18 – The members of Kiss show their faces without their makeup for the first time on MTV, simultaneous with the release of their album Lick It Up.
September 20 – The first ARMS Charity Concert is held at the Royal Albert Hall in London.
November 12 – Duran Duran start their SING BLUE SILVER World Tour. The tour begins with sold-out shows in Australia
November 26 – Quiet Riot's Metal Health album tops the US album charts, the first heavy metal album to hit #1 in America.
December 2
The Uday-Ustav Festival, a tribute to Uday Shankar, is staged at the instigation of Uday's younger brother, Ravi Shankar.
Michael Jackson's 14-minute music video for Thriller is premiered on MTV.
Phish plays first show.
December 25 – Marvin Gaye gives his father, as a Christmas present, an unlicensed Smith & Wesson .38 special caliber pistol so that Gaye could protect himself from intruders. A few months later, Gaye Sr would use it to shoot his son dead.
December 31 – The twelfth annual New Year's Rockin' Eve special airs on ABC, with appearances by Culture Club, Rick James, Laura Branigan, Barry Manilow, Mary Jane Girls and David Frizzell.

Bands formed 
See Musical groups established in 1983

Bands disbanded
See Musical groups disestablished in 1983

Bands reformed
The Animals
The Everly Brothers

Albums released

January–March

April–June

July–September

October–December

Release date unknown

21 Years On – The Dubliners (live)
Ageless Medley EP – Amy Grant
Ain't It Good to Be Free – Bo Diddley
All Alone with Friends – Hank Marvin
Amore – The Hooters
Angstlos – Nina Hagen
Bad Influence – Robert Cray
Bay of Kings – Steve Hackett
Beat Street – Prism
Before Hollywood – The Go-Betweens
Behind the Scenes – Reba McEntire
The Belle Stars – The Belle Stars (debut)
The Blasting Concept – Various Artists
The Brightest Smile in Town (Dr. John Plays Mac Rebennack, Vol. 2) - Dr. John
Buzz or Howl Under the Influence of Heat – Minutemen
A Call to Us All – Teri Desario
Catch as Catch Can – Kim Wilde
Chazablanca – Chaz Jankel
A Child's Adventure – Marianne Faithfull
Chimera - Bill Nelson
A Christmas Album – Amy Grant
Come Away with ESG – ESG
Crystal Logic – Manilla Road
Dagger and Guitar – Sort Sol
Dancing for Mental Health – Will Powers (actually Lynn Goldsmith)
David Grisman's Acoustic Christmas - David GrismanDawg Jazz/Dawg Grass - David GrismanDesperate – DivinylsDressed for the Occasion – Cliff Richard and The London Philharmonic Orchestra (Live)Doot-Doot – FreurEmergency Third Rail Power Trip – Rain ParadeEscapade – Tim Finn
Even the Strong Get Lonely – Tammy Wynette
Everywhere at Once – The Plimsouls
Fall in a Hole – The Fall
Feeding the Flame – Sad Lovers and Giants
The First Four Years – Black Flag
The Fittest of the Fittest - Burning Spear
The Fugitive – Tony Banks
Forged in Fire – Anvil
Fortune 410 – Donnie Iris
Friends of Hell – Witchfinder General
Golden Shower of Hits – Circle Jerks
Good as Gold - Red Rockers
Good Love & Heartbreak – Tammy Wynette
Heart to Heart – Merle Haggard
Ich halt zu Dir – Die Flippers
Imagination – Helen Reddy
Into Glory Ride – Manowar
Introducing The Style Council – The Style Council
Jonathan Sings! – Jonathan Richman
Killer Dwarfs – Killer Dwarfs (Debut)
The Kitchen Tapes – The Raincoats
Klass – Bad Manners
Lesson Well Learned EP – Armored Saint
Let's Go - Nitty Gritty Dirt Band
Let's Start a War – The Exploited
Love Is the Law – Toyah
Merry Twistmas – Conway Twitty
Music for the Hard of Thinking – Doug and the Slugs
Naked – Kissing the Pink
Night Dubbing – Imagination
Not of this World – Petra
One Night with a Stranger – Martin Briley
Over the Edge – Wipers
Party Tonight – Modern Romance
Passionfruit – Michael FranksPlatinum Blonde – Platinum Blonde (debut EP)Playback – SSQ
Privilege – Ivor Cutler
Prodigal Sons – The Dubliners
Neruda – Red Rider
The Real Macaw – Graham Parker
Riding with the King – John Hiatt
Secretos – José José
Shine On – George Jones
Shock Troops – Cock Sparrer
Sleep in Safety – 45 Grave
Song and Legend – Sex Gang Children
The Southern Death Cult – Southern Death Cult
Speeding Time – Carole King
The Spell - Syreeta Wright
Stages – Elaine Paige
Star People – Miles Davis
Steeler – Steeler (Yngwie Malmsteen & Ron Keel's 1st band, This band's only release)
Strive to Survive Causing Least Suffering Possible – Flux of Pink Indians
Struggle for Pleasure – Wim Mertens
Sub Pop 9 – Various Artists
Syncro System – King Sunny Ade and his African Beats
Tales from the Lush Attic – IQ
Thank You for the Music – ABBA – compilation
That's the Way Love Goes – Merle Haggard
Third Generation – Hiroshima
A Todo Rock – Menudo
Tougher Than Leather – Willie Nelson
Travels – The Pat Metheny Group
Trick of the Light – Modern Romance
Urban Dancefloor Guerillas – P-Funk All-Stars
Visions (Gladys Knight & the Pips album) - Gladys Knight & the Pips
A Walk Across the Rooftops – Blue Nile
Water Sign – Chris Rea
We Are One – Maze featuring Frankie Beverly
Weeds & Water – Riders in the Sky
We've Got Tonight – Kenny Rogers
When the Going Gets Tough, the Tough Get Going – Bow Wow Wow
Words and Music – Tavares
XXV – The Shadows
Yes Sir, I Will – Crass
Yokan (Hunch) – Miyuki Nakajima
You Ain't Seen Nothing Yet – Bachman–Turner Overdrive – compilation
Zeichnungen des Patienten O. T. (Drawings of Patient O. T.) – Einstürzende Neubauten

Biggest hit singles
The following songs achieved the highest chart positions
in the charts of 1983.

Top 40 Chart hit singles

Other Chart hit singles

Notable singles

Other Notable singles

Published popular music 
 "I Guess That's Why They Call It the Blues" w. Bernie Taupin m. Elton John
 "An Innocent Man" w.m. Billy Joel
 "Karma Chameleon" w.m. George O'Dowd, Jon Moss, Roy Hay, Mikey Craig & Phil Rickett
 "Uptown Girl" w.m. Billy Joel
 "Total Eclipse of the Heart" – w.m. Jim Steinman

Classical music

Premieres

Compositions
Vyacheslav Artyomov – Tristia for solo piano, organ, trumpet, vibraphone and strings
Jean-Baptiste Barrière – Chreode I
John Cage – Thirty Pieces for String Quartet
Friedrich Cerha – Requiem für Hollensteiner
George Crumb – Processional for piano
Jean Daetwyler – Concerto for Alphorn, Flute, Saxophone and Strings No. 2
Mario Davidovsky – Romancero, for soprano, flute (piccolo, alto flute), clarinet (bass clarinet), violin and violoncello
Lorenzo Ferrero
Ellipse for flute
Onde for guitar
Karel Goeyvaerts – Aquarius I (Voorspel)—L'ère du Verseau, for orchestra
Jacques Hétu – Clarinet Concerto
Simeon ten Holt – Lemniscaat, for keyboard (1982–1983)
Wojciech Kilar – fanfare Victoria for mixed choir and orchestra
Witold Lutosławski – Symphony No. 3 (1972–83)
Krzysztof Penderecki – Viola Concerto
John Pickard – Nocturne in Black and Gold
Peter Sculthorpe – Piano concerto
Karlheinz Stockhausen – Luzifers Tanz, for wind orchestra
Iannis Xenakis – Shaar
Morton Feldman – Crippled Symmetry

Opera
Robert Ashley – Perfect Lives (An opera for television)
Leonard Bernstein – A Quiet Place
Oliver Knussen – Where the Wild Things Are (children's)
Olivier Messiaen – Saint François d'Assise
Per Nørgård – Det guddommelige Tivoli (The Divine Circus)

Jazz

Musical theater
 La Cage aux Folles – Broadway production opened at the Palace Theatre and ran for 1781 performances
 Doonesbury – Broadway production opened at the Biltmore Theatre and ran for 104 performances
 Mame (Jerry Herman) – Broadway revival
 Merlin – Broadway production opened at the Mark Hellinger Theatre and ran for 199 performances
 Oliver! (Lionel Bart) – London revival
 On Your Toes – Broadway revival
 My One and Only – Broadway production opened at the St. James Theatre and ran for 767 performances
 Singin' in the Rain – London production
 The Tap Dance Kid – Broadway production opened at the Broadhurst Theatre and ran for 699 performances
 Zorba – Broadway revival

Musical films
 Carmen
 Eddie and the Cruisers
 Flashdance
 Le Bal
 Mangammagari Manavadu
 Narcissus
 Neti Bharatam
 The Pirates of Penzance
 Rock & Rule
 Staying Alive
 Yentl

Musical television
 Salad Days

Births

January–April births

January
January 7 –Tosin Abasi, Nigerian-American musician (Animals As Leaders)
January 13 – William Hung, American musician
January 14 – Takako Uehara, Japanese singer
Januray 16 - SYML, SYML is the solo venture of Brian Fennell,
January 18 
Samantha Mumba, Irish singer and actress
Mike Ezay, American R&B singer (Git Fresh)
Katie White, British singer (The Ting Tings)
January 19 – Hikaru Utada, Japanese singer and songwriter
January 20 – Mari Yaguchi, Japanese singer (Morning Musume) and host
January 21 – Rapsody, American rapper
January 24 – Frankie Grande, American actor, singer, and dancer
January 25 – Andrée Watters, Canadian singer
January 30 – Ella Hooper, Australian rock singer-songwriter, musician, radio presenter and TV personality (Killing Heidi + The Verses)

February births
February 1 – Andrew VanWyngarden, American singer-songwriter and guitarist (MGMT)
February 5 – Baby K, Singaporean-Italian singer-songwriter
February 8 – Jim Verraros, American singer
February 10 – Bless, Canadian rapper
February 13 – Joel Little, New Zealand record producer, musician and Grammy Award-winning songwriter (Lorde, Taylor Swift)
February 17 – Kevin Rudolf, American record producer and musician
February 19 – Mika Nakashima, Japanese singer and actress
February 28 – Linda Király, Hungarian-American singer-songwriter

March births
March 8 – Piano Squall, American pianist
March 9 – Mayte Perroni, Mexican singer and actress
March 10 – Carrie Underwood, American singer/songwriter
March 11 – Thiaguinho, Brazilian singer-songwriter
March 14 – Taylor Hanson American band member (Hanson)
March 15 – Florencia Bertotti, Argentine actress and singer
March 19 – Ana Rezende (Cansei de Ser Sexy), Brazilian
March 29
Luiza Sá (Cansei de Ser Sexy), Brazilian
Jamie Woon, British singer, songwriter and record producer,
March 30 – Hebe Tian, member of the Taiwanese girl-group S.H.E
March 31 – 40 (record producer), Canadian record producer, collaborator with Drake

April births
April 4 – Tei, Korean ballad singer
April 15 – Margo Price, American singer-songwriter
April 16 – Marié Digby, American singer, songwriter, guitarist, and pianist
April 18
Ameerah (singer), Belgian singer-songwriter
Reeve Carney, American singer-songwriter and actor
April 20 – Sebastian Ingrosso, Swedish DJ, actor and record producer
April 21 – Lily Chan, Chinese singer

May–August births

May births
May 8
Bondan Prakoso, Indonesian singer
Matt Willis, British musician (Busted) and presenter
May 10 – Moshe Peretz, Israeli musician
May 11 – Holly Valance, Australian actress, singer and model.
May 14 – Anahí, Mexican singer and actress
May 15 – Devin Bronson, American guitarist, songwriter and producer
 May 27 - Sean Douglas (songwriter), American songwriter and record producer

June births
June 2 – Brooke White, American singer
June 3 – Kelela, American singer and songwriter.
June 7 – Indiggo, Romanian-born American twin sisters, singer-songwriters, and reality TV personalities
June 8 – Lee Harding, Australian singer
June 9 – Marina Lizorkina, Russian singer 
June 10 - Jason Evigan, American musician, singer, songwriter, and record producer. 
June 15 – Laura Imbruglia, Australian indie rock singer-songwriter.
June 16 – Jen Majura, German guitarist, bassist and singer.
June 17
Connie Fisher, British actress and singer
Lee Ryan, British singer
June 24 – Shermain Jeremy, Antiguan singer and beauty pageant contestant
June 27 – Evan Taubenfeld, American guitarist, singer, and songwriter (Avril Lavigne)
June 30
Patrick Wolf, English singer-songwriter
Cheryl, former member of Girls Aloud, British singer-songwriter and television personality

July births
July 1
Leeteuk, South Korean singer-songwriter and actor.
Marit Larsen, Norwegian musician (M2M)
July 2 – Michelle Branch, American singer-songwriter and musician (The Wreckers)
July 3
Matt Papa, American singer-songwriter
July 4
Ben Jorgensen, American singer, guitarist, member of Armor For Sleep
Andrew Mrotek, American drummer (The Academy Is...)
July 7 – Ciara Newell, Irish singer (Bellefire)
July 9 – Lucia Micarelli, violinist and actress
July 10 – Heechul, South Korean singer, songwriter
July 11
Megan Marie Hart, opera singer
Marie Serneholt (A*Teens)
July 17 – Joker Xue, Chinese singer-songwriter
July 18 – Aaron Gillespie, drummer (Underoath)
July 21 – Eivør Pálsdóttir, Faroese singer and composer
July 22 - Sharni Vinson, Australian dancer, actor and television personality 
July 23 – Bec Hewitt, Australian singer, dancer, and actor
July 24 – Morgan Sorne, American singer-songwriter and multi-media artist
July 31 - Yola (singer), English singer-songwriter, musician, and actress

August births
August 7 – Christian Chávez, Mexican singer and actor
August 8 – Vanessa Amorosi, Australian singer/songwriter
August 9 – Ashley Johnson, American actress, voice actress and singer.
August 14 – Sunidhi Chauhan, playback singer
August 18
Danny!, American record producer/recording artist
Mika, British singer
Emma McKenna, Canadian singer-songwriter
August 19
Tammin Sursok, South African-born Australian actress and singer.
Missy Higgins, Australian singer-songwriter, musician and actress.
August 21 - Brody Jenner, American dj
August 25 – James Righton, English musician, multi instrumentalist
August 28 – Alfonso Herrera, Mexican singer and actor
August 30 – Jun Matsumoto, Japanese singer and actor

September–December births

September births
September 12 – Frank Dukes, Canadian record producer and dj
September 14 – Amy Winehouse, English soul, jazz, blues and rnb singer-songwriter (died 2011)
September 17 – Jennifer Peña, American singer and actress
September 20 – A-Lin, Taiwanese singer
September 25 – Donald Glover, American actor, comedian, writer, director, rapper, and DJ
September 30 – T-Pain, American rapper & singer-songwriter

October births
October 7 – Flying Lotus, American rapper and producer, founded Brainfeeder
October 10
Alyson Hau, Hong Kong radio DJ
Jack Savoretti, English acoustic artist (Kylie Minogue)
Lzzy Hale, American singer, songwriter, and musician. (Halestorm)
October 20 – Alona Tal, Israeli singer and actress.
October 22 – Plan B, English hip hop rapper
October 24 – Adrienne Bailon, American singer and actress
October 26 – Houston, American R&B singer
October 29
Amit Sebastian Paul, Swedish singer (A-Teens)
Richard Brancatisano, Australian actor/musician
October 30 – Diana Karazon, Jordanian singer

November births
November 7 – Forrest Kline, American singer and songwriter (Hellogoodbye)
November 10 – Miranda Lambert, American country musician
November 14
Lil Boosie, American rapper
Chelsea Wolfe, American singer-songwriter
November 16
Fallon Bowman, South African–born guitarist (Kittie)
K, South Korean singer
November 22 – Xiao Yu, Taiwanese singer and songwriter 
November 27 – Nyla, Jamaican singer and songwriter (Brick & Lace)
November 28
Rostam Batmanglij,  American record producer, musician, singer, songwriter, and composer (Vampire Weekend)
Tyler Glenn, American alternative singer (Neon Trees)

December births
December 3 – Sherri DuPree, American singer-songwriter
December 12 – Katrina Elam, American country singer-songwriter
December 15 – Brooke Fraser, New Zealand singer-songwriter, musician
December 17 
 Kosuke Saito, Japanese DJ
 Domino Kirke,  British-American singer, doula, and actress
December 29 – Jessica Andrews, American country music singer
December 31 – Sayaka Ichii, Japanese singer (Morning Musume)

Birth date unknown
unknown
Dan Sultan, Australian alternative rock singer-songwriter-guitarist
Joseph Tawadros, Egyptian-born Australian oud virtuoso
 Riopy, French-born British pianist and composer. (worked with Lana Del Rey)

Deaths

January–April deaths

January deaths
January 5 – Amy Evans, operatic soprano and actress, 98
January 7 – Edith Coates, operatic mezzo-soprano, 74
January 28 – Billy Fury, singer, 42 (heart attack)
January 31 – Lorraine Ellison, soul singer, 51

February deaths
February 4 – Karen Carpenter, singer and drummer, 32 (cardiac arrest due to anorexia nervosa)
February 8
Charles Kullman, operatic tenor, 80
Alfred Wallenstein, cellist, 84
February 12 – Eubie Blake, pianist, 96
February 18 – Leopold Godowsky, Jr., violinist and chemist, 82
February 22 – Sir Adrian Boult, conductor, 93
February 23 – Herbert Howells, organist and composer, 90
February 28 – Winifred Atwell, Trinidadian pianist, 69

March deaths
March 6 – Cathy Berberian, singer and composer, 57
March 7
Igor Markevitch, Ukrainian composer and conductor, 70
William Walton, British composer, 80

April deaths
April 4 – Danny Rapp (Danny and the Juniors), 41 (suicide by gunshot)
April 5 – Cliff Carlisle, country and blues singer, 79
April 13 – Dolo Coker, jazz pianist and composer, 55
April 14 – Pete Farndon (The Pretenders), English bassist, 30 (drug overdose)
April 17 – Felix Pappalardi, American producer and bassist, 43 (gunshot)
April 23 – Earl Hines, American jazz pianist, 79
April 30
Muddy Waters, blues singer and guitarist, 70 (heart attack)
George Balanchine, Russian-American choreographer, 79

May–August deaths

May deaths
May 23
George Bruns, film composer, 68
Finn Mortensen, composer and music critic, 61
May 25 – Paul Quinichette, saxophonist, 67

June deaths
June 2 – Stan Rogers, folk musician, 33
June 25 – Alberto Ginastera, Argentine composer, 67

July deaths
July 4 – Claus Adam, cellist, 66
July 5 – Harry James, bandleader, 67
July 12 – Chris Wood, rock musician, 39
July 23 – Georges Auric, French composer, member of Les Six, 84
July 27 – Jerome Moross, composer, conductor and orchestrator, 69
July 30 – Howard Dietz, lyricist, 86

August deaths
August 2 – James Jamerson, bassist, 47
August 3 – Helge Bonnén, pianist and composer, 87
August 6 – Klaus Nomi, singer, 39 (complications from AIDS)
August 13 – Zdeněk Liška, Czech film composer, 61
August 14 – Omer Létourneau, pianist, organist, composer and conductor, 92
August 17 – Ira Gershwin, American lyricist, 86
August 24 – Arkady Filippenko, composer, 71

September–December deaths

September deaths
September 5 – John Gilpin, dancer, 53 (heart attack)
September 24 – Isobel Baillie, operatic soprano, 88
September 25 – Paul Jacobs, American pianist, 53 (complications from AIDS)

October deaths
October 16
Øivin Fjeldstad, violinist and conductor, 80
George Liberace, violinist and arranger, 72

November deaths
November 3 – Alfredo Antonini, conductor, 82
November 7 – Germaine Tailleferre, composer, only female member of Les Six, 88
November 15 – John Grimaldi, English keyboard player and songwriter (Argent), 28
November 19 – Tommy Evans, bassist of the rock group Badfinger, 36 (suicide)

December deaths
December 6 – Lucienne Boyer, French singer, 80
December 11 – Simon Laks, Polish composer and violinist, 82
December 28 – Dennis Wilson, American singer, songwriter and drummer, 39 (drowned)

Death date unknown
date unknown
Antonio Mairena, Andalusian flamenco singer, 73 or 74
Pat Smythe, Scottish-born jazz pianist, 59 or 60

Awards

Grammy Awards
Grammy Awards of 1983

Country Music Association Awards
1983 Country Music Association Awards

Eurovision Song Contest
Eurovision Song Contest 1983

Charts
 List of Billboard Hot 100 number-one singles of 1983
 1983 in music (UK)
 :Category:Record labels established in 1983

See also
Ronald Reagan in music

References

 
20th century in music
Music by year